Prudentópolis Futebol Clube, commonly known as Prudentópolis, is a Brazilian football club based in Prudentópolis, Paraná state. The club was formerly known as Serrano Centro-Sul Esporte Clube.

History
The club was founded on November 1, 2007 as Serrano Centro-Sul Esporte Clube. The club won the Campeonato Paranaense Third Level in 2008, after beating São José-PR in the final. Serrano won the Campeonato Paranaense Second Level in 2009., qualifying to compete in the 2009 Recopa Sul-Brasileira, when they were defeated in the final by Joinville 3-2, on December 13, 2009 at Estádio Municipal Domenico Paolo Metidieri, in Votorantim, São Paulo state. They competed in the Campeonato Paranaense in 2010, when they finished in the 12th place out of 14 teams, thus being relegated to the following year Second Level. The club was renamed to Prudentópolis Futebol Clube in 2013.

Achievements

 Campeonato Paranaense Second Level:
 Winners (1): 2009
 Campeonato Paranaense Third Level:
 Winners (1): 2008

Stadium
Prudentópolis Futebol Clube play their home games at Estádio Newton Agibert. The stadium has a maximum capacity of 3,500 people.

References

Association football clubs established in 2007
Football clubs in Paraná (state)
2007 establishments in Brazil